Route 714, or Highway 714, may refer to:

Costa Rica
 National Route 714

Malaysia
Malaysia Federal Route 714

United Kingdom
 A714 road

United States 
 County Road 714 (Martin County, Florida)
 Florida State Road 714
Kentucky Route 714
 Louisiana Highway 714
 Ohio State Route 714 (former)
 Puerto Rico Highway 714
 South Carolina Highway 714
Tennessee State Route 714
 Virginia State Route 714 (1930-1933)